The South African Railways Class Experimental 6 4-8-0 of 1906 was a steam locomotive from the pre-Union era in the Cape of Good Hope.

In 1906, the Cape Government Railways placed a single experimental 10th Class steam locomotive with a  Mastodon type wheel arrangement in service on its Eastern System. In 1912, when this locomotive was assimilated into the South African Railways, it was renumbered and designated Class Experimental 6.

Manufacturer
The Cape 10th Class steam locomotive was designed by H.M. Beatty, the Locomotive Superintendent of the Cape Government Railways (CGR) from 1896 to 1910. The designs were prepared at the Salt River shops of the CGR in Cape Town and represented a further effort on Beatty's part to improve the steaming efficiency of his 8th Class of 1904. The 10th Class was, in most respects, a larger and more powerful version of the 8th Class, which it was meant to eventually replace on the Eastern System. In 1906, only one locomotive with a Type XF2 tender was delivered by Kitson and Company, numbered 880.

Characteristics

In the designs of the two Cape 9th Class Mikado types, later the Classes Experimental 4 and Experimental 5, Beatty had achieved improved steaming efficiency by extending the locomotive frames with a bridle casting, such as the one he had designed for the CGR 6th Class 2-6-4 in 1901, to accommodate deep and wide fireboxes.

With the 10th Class, on the other hand, he obtained a wide firebox by spreading the grate over the rear coupled wheels, hence the requirement to raise the boiler pitch. The front portion of the firebox formed a combustion chamber, which reduced spark throwing and thereby reduced wear on the tube ends. This firebox design was uncomplicated and allowed for liberal water spaces. The result was a firebox which was virtually a copy of the one which was used on the Hendrie B locomotive which had been placed in service on the Natal Government Railways (NGR) in 1904.

The locomotive used saturated steam and had flat "D" type slide valves, placed above the cylinders and operated by Stephenson Link valve gear through rocker shafts. The leading wheels were mounted in a spring control bogie which was designed to overcome the problems of excessive flange wear on the coupled wheels and rail cutting on curves.

Service

Cape Government Railways
The locomotive was placed in service on the Eastern System, working on the mainline out of East London. It proved to be very successful in service and was able to handle loads of  up the steep 1 in 40 (2½%) gradient of the mainline, which began right at the end of the departure platform at East London station at the time.

Despite its good performance, the design was never repeated since some trouble was experienced with the firebox which, although wide, had to be shallow to be carried over the intermediate and trailing coupled wheels. Instead, Beatty decided that more powerful locomotives could be designed by using the wide and deep firebox which he had used in his Karoo Class locomotives and the Cape 10th Class therefore remained one of a kind.

South African Railways
When the Union of South Africa was established on 31 May 1910, the three Colonial government railways (CGR, NGR and Central South African Railways) were united under a single administration to control and administer the railways, ports and harbours of the Union. Although the South African Railways and Harbours came into existence in 1910, the actual classification and renumbering of all the rolling stock of the three constituent railways were only implemented with effect from 1 January 1912.

In 1912, the Cape 10th Class was designated Class Experimental 6 and renumbered to 1244 on the South African Railways. It was withdrawn from service in 1938.

References

2150
2150
2150
4-8-0 locomotives
2D locomotives
Kitson locomotives
Cape gauge railway locomotives
Railway locomotives introduced in 1906
1906 in South Africa
Scrapped locomotives